Deurne is a rural municipality and eponymous village in the province of North Brabant in the Netherlands.

History 
First recorded as Durninum (near / by thorns) in a deed of gift from the Frankish Lord Herelaef to bishop Willibrord in 721, Deurne remained a collection of subsistence farming hamlets west of the Peel peat moor until the 2nd half of the 19th century, when a newly built railroad (Eindhoven - Venlo in 1866) and a canal (Zuid-Willemsvaart canal in 1826) enabled the commercial exploitation of the moor. Although the peat industry did not yield much of a profit in the era of coal powered industries, the cultivation of the newly cleared land, in the 1930s also by forced labour, gave a boost to agriculture, farming, and settlement alike. Today only tiny pieces of this former peat moor remain, some reflooded as mini wetlands, scattered along the fault line that once brought about its very existence.

Coincidentally the very same Anglo Dutch Griendtsveen Peat Moss Litter Company Ltd. that extracted a significant part of the peat in the Peel moved to Thorne (Moorends) South Yorkshire, U.K., where several of its Dutch employees settled as immigrant workers.

Transportation 
Deurne railway station

Culture 
In 2009 the new "Cultural Centre" (cultureel centrum) opened its doors. It is the Martien van Doorne Cultuur Centrum and serves as a theatre, concert hall, and movie theatre.

The local dialect is Peellands (an East Brabantian dialect, which is very similar to colloquial Dutch).

International relations

Twin towns – Sister cities
Deurne is twinned with:

Notable people 
 Lucas Gassel (c.1488 in Deurne – 1568 or 1569) a Renaissance painter known for his landscapes
 Aaltje Noordewier–Reddingius (1868 in Deurne – 1949) a Dutch classical soprano and voice teacher
 Jules de Corte (1924 in Deurne – 1996) blind singer-songwriter from the Netherlands
 Laurens van den Acker (born 1965 in Deurne) an automobile designer
 Erik van Lieshout (born 1968 in Deurne) a Dutch contemporary artist

Gallery

References

External links

Official website

 
Municipalities of North Brabant
Populated places in North Brabant